Midnight Traveler is a 2019 documentary film directed by Hassan Fazili. Filmed on three smartphones by Fazili and his wife, Fatima Hussaini, and their two daughters, it chronicles their three-year journey from their home in Afghanistan to Europe in search for asylum.

The film premiered in the World Cinema Documentary Competition at the Sundance Film Festival in January 2019, where it won the Special Jury Award for No Borders. It also screened in the Panorama section at the Berlin International Film Festival in February 2019, where it won the second prize in the documentary section. It was nominated for Best Documentary at the 2019 Gotham Independent Film Awards. PBS aired the film as part of the POV series on December 30, 2019. As an episode of the series, the film received a Peabody Award in 2020.

Background
Fazili and Hussaini, who are self-taught filmmakers, owned Kabul's Art Café and Restaurant, a place where men and women with reformist beliefs would congregate, until conservative religious leaders organized a boycott and a police raid, forcing the couple to shut it down. In 2015, after Fazili's documentary about Mullah Tur Jan, a former Taliban commander who renounced the cause, aired on national television, Taliban murdered Mullah Tur Jan and put a bounty on Fazili's head. The Fazilis fled to Tajikistan and applied for asylum, but after 14 months, they were deported back to Afghanistan. This is the context in which the film begins.

Content
The family leaves for Europe, on the so-called "Balkan route". They reach Turkey through Iran by car, and then Bulgaria with the help of smugglers. Though they find a place to stay at a refugee camp, they fall victim to hate crime and head to Serbia, en route to which they are forced to camp out for days. They arrive at a refugee camp in Hungary, where they spend a year waiting to be able to request asylum. The family then get detained for three months before being finally granted refugee status in April 2018.

Aftermath
Without permission from authorities, the Fazilis moved to Germany the same month they were granted refugee status, because of the poor treatment they received in the detention center in Hungary. German authorities declined the Fazilis' request to stay, forcing them to live in poor condition in Hungary until November 2019. They were then granted permanent residency in Germany.

Production
Persian-speaking filmmaker Emelie Mahdavian, who produced and edited the film, set up "contact points" in each country to copy footage Fazili stored in SD cards and send it to her in the United States so that, once the footage was received, the family could delete old footage and secure storage space on their phones to shoot new footage. Mahdavian joined Fazili in Serbia to work on story development and record voice-over. 300 hours of footage and 25 hours of voice-over were edited down to the 87-minute film. While the Fazilis were waiting for their asylum request to be processed, the production team joined them in Germany to work on post-production.

Release
In March 2019, Oscilloscope acquired the North American rights to the film. It released the film theatrically on September 18, 2019.

Reception
The site's critical consensus reads, "Midnight Traveler puts a harrowing personal face on the modern refugee crisis, driving home the heartbreakingly relatable odysseys of the displaced." On Metacritic, the film has a weighted average score of 79 out of 100, based on 18 critics, indicating "generally favorable reviews".

Wendy Ide of Screen International called the film an "affecting, essential documentary" and wrote, "the suffering, fear and humiliation that they experience is balanced by moments of warmth and an artist's magpie eye for unexpected glimpses of beauty. It's a remarkable achievement." Simran Hans of The Observer wrote, "the combination of perspectives paints a vivid and hopeful portrait of a family, as well as an indictment of the refugee crisis". Gary Garrison of The Playlist gave the film an A− grade, writing, "It does not set out to tell  story, nor does it shoehorn statistics in about violence in Afghanistan or families forced from their homes ... Midnight Traveler, rather, is a film about a family, about the hardship and inhumanity they have endured, about their bravery, about their love, about their hope, and, above all else, about their desire to be safe and in control of their lives and bodies and destinies and fates."

Manohla Dargis of The New York Times wrote, "What largely distinguishes Midnight Traveler is its anxious intimacy, a sense of uneasy closeness that pulls you into a family circle that at times gets very small ... The filmmakers are chronicling their own lives, of course. But they are also documenting a far larger catastrophe, one that comes in different languages and affects innumerable families." Vanessa H. Larson of The Washington Post described the film as "the extraordinary first-person account of filmmaker Hassan Fazili's escape from Afghanistan with his family" and wrote, "The film captures not only the harrowing moments of their ordeal but also the sheer tedium of the seemingly endless waiting and uncertainty that come with being refugees."

Doreen St. Félix of The New Yorker wrote, "There is a defiance to the Fazilis' methods of documenting their hell on earth. The film has flair, a sense of style and drama, and of playfulness." St. Félix called for better recognition of the film's "narrative and aesthetic strengths", which she argued "are not superficial flourishes but indeed inseparable from how we observe the family unit".

References

External links

2019 films
Dari-language films
2019 documentary films
American documentary films
Canadian documentary films
British documentary films
Documentary films about refugees
Documentary films about immigration to Europe
Documentary films about Afghanistan
Films shot in Afghanistan
Films shot in Tajikistan
Films shot in Iran
Films shot in Turkey
Films shot in Bulgaria
Films shot in Serbia
Films shot in Hungary
Mobile phone films
POV (TV series) films
2010s American films
2010s Canadian films
2010s British films